Alex Seidu Sofo (2 February 1950 – 9 January 2020) was a Ghanaian politician. He served as a member of parliament for the Damango-Daboya constituency.

Early life and education 
Sofo was born on February 2, 1950, and is a native from Busunu in the current Savannah Region. He obtained his Teachers' certificate A in Education.

Career 
Sofo was a teacher by profession. He was also a Chief from the Busunu Traditional Area (Chief Mfrawura).

Political career 
Sofo was the Assemblyman for Ngbaripe/Hangaline Electoral Area before winning the 2000 Ghanaian Parliamentary elections on the ticket of the New Patriotic Party (NPP). He was the third Member of Parliament for Damongo-Daboya Constituency having succeeded Hon Mahama Shakan.  He became a member of the third parliament of the fourth republic of Ghana during the 2000 Ghanaian general elections for the then Damongo-Daboya Constituency and also a member of the fourth parliament of the fourth republic of Ghana during the 2004 Ghanaian General Election for the same constituency on the ticket of the New Patriotic Party.

He was also Former Deputy Minister of Roads and Highways under the erstwhile President John Agyekum Kufuor administration.

Elections  
Sofo was elected as a Member of Parliament for the then Damongo-Daboya Constituency in the Northern Region of Ghana during the 2000 Ghanaian general elections after serving as an Assemblyman for Ngbaripe/Hangaline Electoral Area with a total vote cast of 8,012 representing 45.90% over his opponents; Nelson Y. Yakubu of the National Democratic Congress who had 7,665 votes which represent 43.90% of the total votes cast, Abudulai Adams of the People's National Convention who also polled 703 representing 4.00% of the total votes cast, Alidu Mahama of the Convention People's Party who polled 549 which represent 3.10% of total votes cast, Ewuntomah C. Boreche of the National Reform Party who also had 377 representing 2.20% and Skido A. Ewuntomah of the United Ghana Movement who polled 143 which represent 0.80% of the total votes cast.  He was again elected as the member of parliament for the Damango-Daboya  constituency of the Northern Region of Ghana in the 2004 Ghanaian general elections. He won on the ticket of the New Patriotic Party. His constituency was a part of the 8 parliamentary seats out of 26 seats won by the New Patriotic Party in that election for the Northern Region. The New Patriotic Party won a majority total of 128 parliamentary seats out of 230 seats.  He was elected with 11,975 votes out of 24,723 total valid votes cast equivalent to 48.4% of total valid votes cast. He was elected over Benedict Kpeno of the People's National Convention, Ykubu Nelson Nyiniefo of the National Democratic Congress, Alidu Mahama of the Convention People's Party and Skido Alhassan of the Every Ghanaian Living Everywhere party. These obtained 2.1%, 47.2%, 1.5% and 0.7% respectively of total valid votes cast.

Personal life 
He was a Christian.

Death 
He died on January 9, 2020, at West Gonja District Hospital where he was receiving treatment.

References 

1950 births
New Patriotic Party politicians
2020 deaths
Ghanaian MPs 2005–2009
Ghanaian MPs 2001–2005
Ghanaian educators
Ghanaian Christians
People from Northern Region (Ghana)